Luca Bati (c. 1546 – 17 October 1608) was an Italian Baroque composer and music teacher. One of his pupils was Marco da Gagliano.

Bati was born and died in Florence. He was maestro di cappella of Pisa Cathedral (1596) and then of the Medici Court and Florence Cathedral (from 1598 to 1599). His dramatic music for Medici weddings and Florentine carnivals is lost but his surviving madrigals (1594, 1598) and sacred works are of high quality though not notably progressive.

Works 

 II primo libro de Madrigali 5 voci (contains 23 madrigals by Bati and one each by Neri Alberti and Antonio Bicci), Venice, 1594
 II secondo libro de Madrigali 5 voci (contains 21 madrigals by Bati and one by Piero Strozzi), Venice, 1598
 Music for the intermedio to Giovan Maria Cecchi's Rappresentazione sacra Esaltazione della Croce, Florence, 1589
 Music for Gino Ginori's Mascherata Le fiamme d'amore, Florence, 1595
 Third and fourth chorus to Il Rapimento di Cefalo (text by Gabriello Chiabrera, music mostly by Giulio Caccini with contributions by Stefano Venturi del Nibbio and Piero Strozzi), Florence, 1600

Further reading 
 D. S. Burchart. "Luca Bati and the Late Cinquecento Madrigal in Florence." In Musicologia humana: studies in honor of Warren and Ursula Kirkendale, edited by S. Gmeinwieser, D. Hiley, and J. Riedlbauer, 251–273. Florence: Olschki, 1994. 
 F. D'Accone. "The Sources of Luca Bati's Sacred Music at the Opera di Santa Maria del Fiore." In Essays on Italian Music in the Cinquecento, edited by R. Charteris, 159–177. Sydney, 1990.  
 P. Gargiulo. Luca Bati, madrigalista fiorentino. Florence: Olschki, 1991. 
 F. Ghisi. "Luca Bati Maestro della Cappella Granducale di Firenze." Revue Belge de Musicologie 8 (1954): 106–108.

External links 
 
 .
 Pannella, Liliana (1970). "Bati, Luca". Dizionario Biografico degli Italiani, Vol. 7. Treccani. Online version retrieved 31 May 2017 .

Italian male classical composers
Italian Baroque composers
1540s births
1608 deaths
17th-century Italian composers
17th-century male musicians